From Dan to Beersheba is a biblical phrase used nine times in the Hebrew Bible to refer to the settled areas of the Tribes of Israel between Dan in the North and Beersheba in the South. The term contributed to the position that was used by British politicians during negotiation of the British Mandate for Palestine following World War I.

Biblical verses
It is found in the biblical verses:

1.  during the Battle of Gibeah at the end of the Book of Judges
"Then all Israel from Dan to Beersheba and from the land of Gilead came together as one and assembled before the LORD in Mizpah."

2.  during the "Calling of Samuel"
"And all Israel from Dan to Beersheba recognized that Samuel was attested as a prophet of the LORD."

3.  during the war between Ish-bosheth and his brother-in-law David following the death of Saul
"...and transfer the kingdom from the house of Saul and establish David’s throne over Israel and Judah from Dan to Beersheba."

4.  during the rebellion of David's son Absalom
"So I advise you: Let all Israel, from Dan to Beersheba—as numerous as the sand on the seashore—be gathered to you, with you yourself leading them into battle."

5. / 6.  /  on David's census of Israel and Judah
"So the king said to Joab and the army commanders with him, “Go throughout the tribes of Israel from Dan to Beersheba and enroll the fighting men, so that I may know how many there are".
"So David said to Joab and the commanders of the troops, “Go and count the Israelites from Beersheba to Dan. Then report back to me so that I may know how many there are."

7.  following David's census of Israel and Judah
"So the LORD sent a plague on Israel from that morning until the end of the time designated, and seventy thousand of the people from Dan to Beersheba died."

8.  following Solomon's ascent to the throne
"During Solomon’s lifetime Judah and Israel, from Dan to Beersheba, lived in safety, everyone under their own vine and under their own fig tree."

9.  during Hezekiah's passover
"They decided to send a proclamation throughout Israel, from Beersheba to Dan, calling the people to come to Jerusalem and celebrate the Passover to the LORD, the God of Israel. It had not been celebrated in large numbers according to what was written."

Modern history

During the peace negotiations following World War I, "from Dan to Beersheba" contributed to the British proposal for the area of Palestine to be carved out of the Ottoman Empire as a League of Nations mandate. On 13 September 1919, a memorandum was handed from Lloyd George to Georges Clemenceau which stated that British Palestine would be "defined in accordance with its ancient boundaries of Dan to Beersheba".

References

Hebrew Bible words and phrases
Mandatory Palestine
Land of Israel